Quartieri Spagnoli (Spanish Neighborhoods) is a part of the city of Naples in Italy. The Neapolitan language is stronger here than anywhere else. The area, encompassing c. 800,000 square metres, consists of a grid of around eighteen streets by twelve, including a population of some 14,000 inhabitants. 

The Quartieri were created in the 16th century to house Spanish garrisons, hence the name, whose role was to quench revolts from the Neapolitan population.

Among the historic churches in the district are:
 Church of the Immacolata Concezione e Purificazione di Maria de' nobili in Montecalvario
 Church of San Carlo alle Mortelle
 Church of San Mattia 
 Church of Santa Maria della Concezione a Montecalvario
 Church of Santa Maria della Lettera
 Church of Santa Maria della Mercede a Montecalvario
 Church of Santa Maria Francesca delle Cinque Piaghe
 Church of Sant'Anna di Palazzo
 Church of Santa Maria del Rosario a Portamedina
 Church of Santa Maria della Concordia
 Church of Santa Maria delle Grazie a Toledo
 Convent and church of Santa Maria dello Splendore
 Church of Santa Maria Ognibene
 Church of Santa Teresella degli Spagnoli
 Church of the Trinità dei Pellegrini
 Church of the Santissima Trinità degli Spagnoli

 
Zones of Naples
History of Naples
History of the Camorra in Italy